See also Jan Vos (poet).
Jan Vos (April 17, 1888 in Utrecht – August 25, 1939 in Dordrecht) was a Dutch amateur football (soccer) player who competed in the 1912 Summer Olympics. He was part of the Dutch team, which won the bronze medal in the football tournament. With 8 goals scored Vos was the 3rd best goalscorer in the tournament.

References

External links
profile

1888 births
1939 deaths
Dutch footballers
Footballers at the 1912 Summer Olympics
Olympic footballers of the Netherlands
Olympic bronze medalists for the Netherlands
Netherlands international footballers
Footballers from Utrecht (city)
Sparta Rotterdam players
Dutch football managers
PSV Eindhoven managers
Olympic medalists in football
Medalists at the 1912 Summer Olympics
Association football forwards